The 1993 Superbike World Championship was the sixth FIM Superbike World Championship season. The season started on 9 April at Brands Hatch; the fourteenth and last round, which was due to be held on the weekend of 7 November in Mexico City, was cancelled on Saturday as a result of track safety issues.

Scott Russell won the riders' championship with 5 victories and Ducati won the manufacturers' championship.

Race calendar and results

Footnotes

Championship standings
In each race, points were awarded as follows:

Riders' standings

 The second race in Zeltweg was stopped early due to rain; half points were awarded.

Manufacturers' standings

 The second race in Zeltweg was stopped early due to rain; half points were awarded.

References

Superbike World Championship
Superbike World Championship seasons